Universidad Austral may refer to:

Austral University (Argentina)
Austral University of Chile